Public Enemies is a 1996 film directed by Mark L. Lester. The movie, which centers on the 1930s figure Ma Barker and her criminal sons, was filmed in Guthrie, Oklahoma. The film was released on direct-to-video in the United States in November 1996.

Plot
Sexually abused by her brothers, Kate Barker runs away to become involved in bootlegging. She marries decent George Barker and gives birth to four sons, Herman, Arthur ("Doc"), Lloyd and Freddie. However, when George's law-abiding ways fail to provide for the family, "Ma" encourages her sons to commit crimes. Soon they become notorious criminals. FBI leader, J Edgar Hoover puts agent Melvin Purvis on the case. Meanwhile Alvin Karpis joins the gang. An attempted robbery leaves one Barker son, Herman, dead, and another Freddie, captured. Arthur Dunlop, a corrupt prison guard, helps Freddie escape and becomes Ma's lover. Dunlop plans a kidnapping that will net them $100,000, but it nearly goes wrong because of his incompetence. The gang kill him. They also kill another incompetent associate, a mob-doctor who messes up an attempt at plastic surgery. By this time Purvis is onto them. Lloyd and Arthur are arrested in Chicago, and Ma and Freddie are killed in a shootout in Florida.

Cast
Theresa Russell as Ma Barker
Eric Roberts as Arthur Dunlop
Alyssa Milano as Amaryllis
James Marsden as Doc Barker
Richard Eden – George Barker
Joe Dain as Lloyd Barker
Gavin Harrison as Freddie Barker
Joseph Lindsey as Herman Barker
Brian Peck as J. Edgar Hoover
Dan Cortese as Melvin Purvis
Grant Cramer as Samuel P. Cowley
Frank Stallone as Alvin Karpis
Rex Linn as Al Spencer
Leah Best as Young Ma Barker

References

External links

1996 films
1996 crime films
1996 direct-to-video films
1990s English-language films
American crime films
Films about Ma Barker
Films directed by Mark L. Lester
Films scored by Christopher Franke
Films set in the 1930s
Films shot in Oklahoma
1990s American films